Alessio Sarri (born 6 July 1973)  is an Italian male wheelchair fencer who won medals at the Paralympic Games.

Biography
Sarri in addition to his four Olympian participations (he boasts a bronze medal), he also boasts 7 medals at the world championships (three gold) and six at the European championships.

Achievements

References

External links
 
 Alessio Sarri at Italian National Olympic Committee
 Alessio Sarri at Fiamme Oro

1973 births
Living people
Paralympic wheelchair fencers of Italy
Paralympic bronze medalists for Italy
Paralympic athletes of Fiamme Oro
Paralympic medalists in wheelchair fencing
Medalists at the 2012 Summer Paralympics
Wheelchair fencers at the 2012 Summer Paralympics